Social Work is a quarterly peer-reviewed academic journal in the field of social work. It was established in 1920 as The Compass and was renamed Social Work Journal in 1948. It obtained its current name in 1956. It is published by Oxford University Press on behalf of the National Association of Social Workers, of which it is the official journal. The editor-in-chief is Tricia Bent-Goodley (Howard University). According to the Journal Citation Reports, the journal has a 2015 impact factor of 1.145.

References

External links

Social work journals
Oxford University Press academic journals
Academic journals associated with learned and professional societies of the United States
Quarterly journals
Publications established in 1920
English-language journals